Hydrelia bella is a moth in the family Geometridae first described by Alfred Ernest Wileman in 1916. It is found in China.

Taxonomy
The species was listed as a synonym of Hydrelia bicolorata, but the genitalia are distinct and it was later reinstated as a valid species.

References

Moths described in 1916
Asthenini
Moths of Asia